Milton, Australia, may refer to:
Milton, New South Wales
Milton, Queensland